Saddha Tissa was the king of Anuradhapura (Sri Lanka) from 137 BC to 119 BC. Saddha Tissa was the son of Kavan Tissa of Ruhuna and the brother of Dutthagamani. He was the ruler of Digamadulla, the present day eastern province of Sri Lanka.

Since crown prince Saliya married a Chandala girl, King Dutugamunu’s younger brother, Saddha Tissa was consecrated as King. King Saddha Tissa continued the remaining work in Mahathupa.

During Saddha Tissa's reign, there was a major fire in the  Lovamahapaya. The king subsequently reconstructed the Lowa Maha Paaya at one third of the cost with seven levels, two less than before.

King Saddha Tissa built the Dighavapi vihara and the Duratissa reservoir.

After King Saddha Tissa’s death, Mahasangha supported the second son of the king, Thulatthana.

See also
 List of Sri Lankan monarchs

References

External links 
 Kings & Rulers of Sri Lanka
 Codrington's Short History of Ceylon
 King Sada-Tissa's Emblem & Inscription
 King Sadda-tissa according to MAHAVAMSA 

Monarchs of Anuradhapura
Sinhalese kings
 Sinhalese Buddhist monarchs
House of Vijaya
2nd-century BC Sinhalese monarchs